Kyra Lamberink (born 15 April 1996) is a Dutch track cyclist, representing Netherlands at international competitions. As a junior, she won the bronze medal at the 2013 European Track Championships (under-23 & junior). She competed at the 2016 UEC European Track Championships finishing fourth in the team sprint event and eight in the 500m time trial event.

Career results

2014
2nd Sprint, Belgian Xmas Meetings
2015
Milton International Challenge
2nd Team Sprint (with Yesna Rijkhoff)
3rd Keirin
2nd Sprint, Belgian Xmas Meetings
3rd Keirin, Revolution - Round 4, Glasgow
3rd Team Sprint, UEC European U23 Track Championships (with Elis Ligtlee)
2016
 1st  Team Sprint, UEC European U23 Track Championships (with Elis Ligtlee)
2017
2nd Team Sprint, Fastest Man on Wheels (with Hetty van de Wouw)
3rd Team Sprint, UEC European Track Championships (with Shanne Braspennincx)
3rd Keirin, US Sprint GP

References

1996 births
Living people
Dutch female cyclists
Dutch track cyclists
People from Hardenberg
Cyclists at the 2019 European Games
European Games medalists in cycling
European Games bronze medalists for the Netherlands
Cyclists from Overijssel
21st-century Dutch women